Stipetić is a Croatian patronymic surname formed by adding the Slavic diminutive suffix -ić to the masculine given name Stipe, a Croatian variant of Stephen, and may refer to:

 Lucki Stipetić, German film producer
 Marijan Stipetić (1930–2011), Croatian swimmer
 Petar Stipetić (1937–2018), Croatian general
 Vladimir Stipetić (1928–2017), Croatian economist and academician
 Werner Herzog Stipetić (born 1942), German screenwriter, film director, author, actor, and opera director

References

Croatian surnames
Patronymic surnames